Valerie Abou Chacra (born 15 January 1992) is a Lebanese actress and beauty pageant titleholder who was crowned Miss Lebanon 2015. She represented Lebanon at Miss World 2015. She has also starred in widely watched Arabic TV series such as 'Ma Fiyi'

Education
Abou Chacra studied Communication Arts: Radio and TV films at the Lebanese American University.

Pageantry
Valerie Abou Chacra was crowned Miss Lebanon on 12 October 2015. She represented Lebanon at Miss World 2015 and was selected among the Top 5 finalists. She was the first woman from Lebanon to place that high in Miss World's history while Mireia Lalaguna from Spain, was also the first Spanish Woman to win the title.

Career
Abou Chacra started acting in a TV series, A'shra Abid Zghar (Ten Little Slaves), in 2014. She later participated in Dancing with the Stars: Raqs el Noujoum in 2016, and finished third. In 2017, she hosted Project Runway. Also she participated in Celebrity Duets Arab World season 3 and finished third. She then made an appearance in the American TV series Teen Wolf during its sixth season. Later on, she acted in Al Hayba Season 2 in 2018, Ma Fiyi  in 2019. and La Hukm Alayh in 2021. Valerie is also founder of @justcarengo, a non-profit organisation to help patients affected by Traumatic Brain Injury.

Personal life
In 2019, she was engaged to a Lebanese businessman, Ziad Ammar. The couple married on 1 August 2020. In September 2021, Valerie gave birth to twin girls.

Filmography

References

External links

1992 births
Living people
People from Beirut
Miss World 2015 delegates
Lebanese Christians
Lebanese American University alumni